Home Guard Command, is the Danish Home Guard's top authority and is a level one authority reporting directly to the Ministry of Defence.

The Home Guard is a volunteer military organization offering a permanent state of readiness. The task of the Home Guard is to support the armed forces - nationally as well as internationally. In addition to this, the Home Guard supports the police, the emergency services, and other civilian authorities. The Home Guard contributes internationally with guard duty, build-up of military capacity, and support to civilian reconstruction. 

The Home Guard has a combined military and civilian leadership. The Commanding General of the Home Guard is responsible for the training and posting of units and managing the Home Guard. The Commissioner of the Home Guard is responsible for recruitment and the public support to the Home Guard in Denmark and general defence in the Danish community.

In times of tension and war the Danish Defence Command assume command over the activated Home Guard units.

Until 2014, the Home Guard Command was located at Generalstok in Kastellet, in Copenhagen. It was then temporarily relocated to Søkvæsthuset in central Copenhagen. From August 2015, it will be placed at Vordingborg Barracks.

Chiefs of the Home Guard

References

Military of Denmark